Shoshone-Bannock Jr./Sr. High School, commonly known as Sho-Ban School is a high school in Fort Hall, Idaho. It serves the Fort Hall Indian Reservation. It is operated by Shoshone-Bannock School District #537, though it does not geographically include any area in Bannock County. The state of Idaho classifies it as a school district.

It is operated by a Native American tribe, under an agreement with the Bureau of Indian Education.

Its basketball team is known for going to the state tournament in their district and have made it 10 times in the last 12 years

Circa 2021 the BIE is to directly operate the school so it can be directly funded by the BIE.

References

External links
 Profile at the Bureau of Indian Education
  - BIE
  - Needs of the high school are on page 3

Public high schools in Idaho
Bannock people
Native American high schools
Shoshone
Schools in Bannock County, Idaho
Public middle schools in Idaho
1996 establishments in Idaho
Native American history of Idaho